Arnad (Issime );  is a town and comune in the Aosta Valley region of northwestern Italy.

See also
Vallée d'Aoste Lard d'Arnad

References

 
Cities and towns in Aosta Valley